WLDY (1340 AM, "Willie 1340") is a radio station broadcasting a classic country format. Licensed to Ladysmith, Wisconsin, United States, the station is currently owned by Michael Oberg and George Manus, through licensee Zoe Communications Inc.

In February 2021, WLDY changed its 
format from sports to classic country, branded as "Willie 1340".

References

External links

LDY
Classic country radio stations in the United States
Rusk County, Wisconsin